The 2019 season was the 107th season of competitive soccer in the United States.

National teams

Men's

Senior

.

Friendlies

CONCACAF Gold Cup

Group D

Knockout stage

Final

2019–20 CONCACAF Nations League

Group A

Goalscorers
Goals are current as of November 19, 2019, after the match against .

U-20

FIFA U-20 World Cup

Group D
<onlyinclude>

U-17

CONCACAF U-17 Championship

Group F

FIFA U-17 World Cup

Group D

U-15

CONCACAF U-15 Championship

Group B

Women's

Senior

.

Friendlies

SheBelieves Cup

FIFA Women's World Cup

Match start times CEST (UTC+2), unless noted with ET (UTC-4)

Group F

Knockout stage

Final

Goalscorers
Goals are current as of November 10, 2019, after the match against .

Managerial changes
This is a list of changes of managers:

Club competitions

Men's

League competitions

Major League Soccer

Conference tables 

 Eastern Conference

 Western Conference

Overall 2019 table 

Note: the table below has no impact on playoff qualification and is used solely for determining host of the MLS Cup, certain CCL spots, the Supporters' Shield trophy, seeding in the 2020 Canadian Championship, and 2020 MLS draft. The conference tables are the sole determinant for teams qualifying for the playoffs.

MLS Playoffs

MLS Cup

USL Championship 
Renamed from United Soccer League (USL) after the 2018 season

Conference tables 
Eastern Conference

Western Conference

USL Championship Final

USL League One 
Inaugural season

National Independent Soccer Association 

Fall Season
East Coast standings

West Coast standings

Cup competitions

US Open Cup

Final

International competitions

CONCACAF competitions

2019 CONCACAF Champions League

teams in bold are still active in the competition

Round of 16

|}

Quarter-finals

|}

Semi-finals

|}

Leagues Cup

teams in bold are still active in the competition

Quarter-finals

|}

Semi-finals

|}

Campeones Cup

Women's

League competitions

National Women's Soccer League

Overall table

NWSL Playoffs

United Women's Soccer

Honors

Professional

Amateur

References
US Soccer Schedule
US Soccer Results
CONCACAF
MLS
NWSL
USL
USL1
NISA

 
Seasons in American soccer
Soccer